The 2018 wildfire season was the deadliest and most destructive wildfire season in California history. It was also the largest on record at the time, now third after the 2020 and 2021 California wildfire seasons. In 2018, there were a total of 103 confirmed fatalities, 24,226 structures damaged or destroyed, and 8,527 fires burning , about 2% of the state's 100 million acres of land. Through the end of August 2018, Cal Fire alone spent $432 million on operations. The catastrophic Camp Fire alone killed at least 85 people, destroyed 18,804 buildings and caused $16.5 billion in property damage, while overall the fires resulted in at least $26.347 billion in property damage and firefighting costs, including $25.4 billion in property damage and $947 million in fire suppression costs.

In mid-July to August 2018, a series of large wildfires erupted across California, mostly in the northern part of the state. On August 4, 2018, a national disaster was declared in Northern California, due to the extensive wildfires burning there.

The Carr Fire in July and August 2018 caused more than $1.5 billion (2018 USD) in property damage. In September 2020, the August Complex surpassed the Mendocino Complex to become California's single-largest recorded wildfire.

In November 2018, strong winds aggravated conditions in another round of large, destructive fires that occurred across the state. This new batch of wildfires included the Woolsey Fire and the Camp Fire. The Camp Fire destroyed the town of Paradise and killed at least 85 people, with 1 still unaccounted for as of August 2, 2019. The Camp Fire destroyed more than 18,000 structures, becoming both California's deadliest and most destructive wildfire on record. AccuWeather estimated the total economic cost of the 2018 wildfires at $400 billion (2018 USD), which includes property damage, firefighting costs, direct and indirect economic losses, as well as recovery expenditures. Another study, published two years after the fires, estimated the total damages at $148.5 billion, including capital losses, health costs and indirect losses.

Causes
Several factors led to the destructiveness of the 2018 California wildfire season. A combination of increased fuel loading and atmospheric conditions influenced by global warming led to a series of destructive fires. Primary causes of wildfire vary geographically based on many factors, such as topography. For example, characteristically dense forests in the Sierra Nevada Mountains harbor fuel-driven fires while the open central valley from the south Bay Area to San Diego County are more prone to wind-driven fire over dry grasslands.

Increase in fuel
A direct contributor to the 2018 California wildfires was an increase in dead tree fuel. By December 2017, there was a record 129 million dead trees in California. Tree mortality is linked to a period during the 2010s of "anomalously warm droughts"  that were severe and long-lasting enough to stand out even amongst California's existing history of wildfires and exceptionally dry conditions. One study focused on the concentrated mortality of densely populated conifers of the Sierra Nevada "found that die-off was closely tied to multi-year deep-rooting-zone drying" and that severity of that dryness can be used to predict mortality. Such drought leaves trees stressed for water, which makes them susceptible to beetle infestation and exacerbates tree mortality further.

Drought intensity lessened in California by 2017, but the effects of tree mortality linger for years. One study expresses a lack of sufficient data to confidently determine the rate of coniferous tree decay in the Sierra Nevada. Nonetheless, it is a gradual process, and the remaining dead tree matter is an optimal fuel source for future wild fires.

Atmospheric conditions
Stanford Earth System Science Professor Noah Diffenbaugh stated that atmospheric conditions for California wildfires are expected to worsen in the future because of the effects of climate change in California and that "what we're seeing over the last few years in terms of the wildfire season in California [is] very consistent with the historical trends in terms of increasing temperatures, increasing dryness, and increasing wildfire risk." Other experts agreed, saying that global warming is to blame for these extreme weather conditions. Global warming has led to higher temperatures and longer summers, creating a drier landscape that gave fires more fuel to burn longer and stronger.

 Research published August 2018 predicted an increase in the number of wildfires in California as a consequence of climate change. However, from a historical perspective, it has been estimated that prior to 1850, about 4.5 million acres (17,000 km2) burned yearly, in fires that lasted for months.

Residential construction in the wildland-urban interface
A wildland–urban interface (or WUI) refers to the zone of transition between unoccupied land and human development. Communities that are within 0.5 miles (0.80  km) of the zone may also be included. These lands and communities adjacent to and surrounded by wildlands are at risk of wildfires. Since the 1990s, over 43% of new residential buildings have been constructed in this area. In some areas, the amount of new residences in those areas is 80%. In the past, when these areas burned, no residences were lost, but now residences are present, which end up being destroyed. Furthermore, a "century of successful fire suppression" performed in an attempt to protect forests and those living in WUIs has also disrupted natural cycles of disturbance and renewed succession of an ecosystem by allowing fuel to reach abnormal density levels discussed above.

Air quality

Northern California and the Central Valley saw drastic increases in air pollutants during the height of the July and August fires, while Southern California also experienced an increase in air pollution in August. Air quality in Northern and Central California remained poor until mid-September 2018, when fire activity was drastically diminished. However, during the November Camp Fire, air quality diminished again, with the majority of the Bay Area being subjected to air quality indexes (AQIs) of 200 and above, in the "unhealthy" region.

Wildfires

Fatalities

On June 4, the Panoche Fire broke out, in a series of three blazes that started in the San Benito County area. While the Panoche incident was the smallest of the three fires, burning only , the remains of three people were found in a destroyed camping trailer in the burn area. The remains were believed to belong to a mother, a toddler, and an infant.

On July 14, a Cal Fire bulldozer operator was killed while fighting the Ferguson Fire, becoming the first firefighter death of the season.

On July 23, the Carr Fire broke out after a vehicle malfunctioned. While the Carr Fire burned in rural areas of Shasta County for the first few days, it crossed the Sacramento River and entered the city limits of Redding, California on the evening of July 26. By the next morning, two firefighters and four civilians had been killed.

On July 29, a firefighter with the National Park Service was killed after a dead tree fell and struck him, while he was fighting the Ferguson Fire. He was "treated on scene, but died before he could be taken to the hospital".

On August 4, a Pacific Gas and Electric Company employee was killed in a vehicle incident while working to restore services to areas impacted by the Carr Fire.

On August 9, a Cal Fire heavy equipment mechanic was killed in a traffic incident while working at the Carr Fire.

On August 13, a firefighter was killed while fighting the Mendocino Complex Fire.

On November 8, 2018, 85 civilians were killed by the Camp Fire, while three firefighters were injured. The number dead had been listed at 87, lowered to 85 by early December when it was discovered one victim was put in several bags. Three people  also died during the Woolsey Fire near Malibu.

Response efforts 
Direct Relief provided emergency, firefighting and medical supplies medications to first responders and affected communities.

Verizon Wireless data throttling
In August 2018, the Santa Clara County Fire Department raised claims against Verizon Wireless that their "unlimited" data service had been throttled while the fire department was attempting to contain the Mendocino Complex Fire. The Verizon contract stated that the department's plan would be throttled down to 200 kbit/s or 600 kbit/s once the department had used 25 GB in a single month. However, the contract stated that the usage related throttling would not apply in certain emergency situations, such as wildfire containment operations. The plan remained throttled, despite the department's notification to Verizon regarding the situation.

Gallery

See also

List of California wildfires
October 2017 Northern California wildfires
December 2017 Southern California wildfires
Climate change in California

References

External links

Current fire information  — California Department of Forestry and Fire Protection (CAL FIRE)
SDSC WiFire Interactive Map — San Diego Supercomputer Center

 
California, 2018
2018
Effects of climate change